NGC 5619 (also known as NGC 5619A) is an intermediate spiral galaxy in the constellation Virgo. The galaxy was found on April 10, 1828 by the British astronomer John Herschel. It is located about 390 million light-years (120 Mpc) away from the Sun.

NGC 5619 is a radio galaxy.

See also  
 List of NGC objects

External links 
 SEDS

References 

Intermediate spiral galaxies
5619
Virgo (constellation)